When the Trees Were Tall (translit. Kogda derevya byli bolshimi) is a 1961 Soviet drama film directed by Lev Kulidzhanov. The film was screened at the 1962 Cannes Film Festival.

This film happened to be one of the first for Yuri Nikulin. This was also one of the most significant role for Inna Gulaya's career, female lead role performer in this film. It was also Lydmila Chursina's debut film.

Plot
After losing his wife during World War II Veteran Kuzma Kuzmich Iordanov does not work, drinks alcohol, makes his living by doing odd jobs. From time to time the Police department calls him in to shame him and threaten him with jail time because of his "parasitic" lifestyle, but all this does not bother him much.

One day Kuzma agrees to help an old lady to deliver a washing machine to her house, (there used to be different fees for doing do - if the building had an elevator - there would be one price for it, if there was not one - then it would cost you more money to deliver it as it requires more time and effort) and accidentally drops it. While running down the stairs, trying to catch it, he stumbles and gets hurt and sent to the hospital. The same old lady that he was delivering the washing machine for comes and visits him. He gets scared thinking she came to be paid for the broken washing machine, but it turns out, she only wanted to see if he was alright. As they talk she tells him her life story, as well as the story about one poor orphan child Natasha from her village. Kuzma, overcome with loneliness, decides to go out there and try to pretend to be Natasha's father.

Natasha indeed believes him to be her father, and takes him in. It turns out she is his exact opposite: independent, dependable, hardworking, but lonely like him. At first they don't get along too well, but soon Kuzma, inspired by her, changes his old ways.

Natasha is reading an article (49:09) from a U.S. newspaper that describes a Freedom Riders demonstration where James Zwerg  was thrown off the bus and his face was smashed against the hot concrete of the road.

Cast
 Inna Gulaya as Natasha
 Yuri Nikulin as Kuzma Kuzmich Iordanov
 Leonid Kuravlyov as Lenka
 Yekaterina Mazurova as Anastasiya Borisovna
 Vasily Shukshin as Chairman of the Kolkhoz
 Lyudmila Chursina as Zoya
 Yelena Korolyova as Nyurka
 Viktor Pavlov
 Vera Orlova

Critical reception
Howard Thompson of The New York Times called the film "an odd, fumbling drama" and thought the hero was "the most negative, ground-down and dull protagonist the Soviet Union has sent us in a long time." He added, "Furthermore, the simple story line slides its course crabwise, wedged in between oblique, pretentious photography — some of it fetchingly pastoral — and splintered, meaningless vignettes."

Awards and nominations
The film was nominated for the Palme d'Or at the 1962 Cannes Film Festival.

References

External links

1961 films
1961 drama films
1960s Russian-language films
Soviet black-and-white films
Films directed by Lev Kulidzhanov
Soviet drama films